Koppala district, officially known as Koppala district is an administrative district in the state of Karnataka in India. In the past Koppal was referred to as 'Kopana Nagara'. Hampi, a World heritage center, covers some areas of Koppala District.  It is situated approximately 38 km away. Anegundi, is also a famous travel destination.

History
Koppal, now a district headquarters, is ancient Kopana, a major Jain holy site. Palkigundu is described as the famous Indrakila parvata of mythology. There is an ancient Shiva temple called the Male Malleshwara. There are two Ashoka inscriptions at Palkigundu and Gavimatha. Koppal was the capital of a branch of Shilaharas under the Chalukyas of Kalyani.  In Shivaji's times it was one of the eight prants or revenue divisions of Southern Maratha Country. During India's First War of Independence, Mundargi Bheema Rao and Hammige Kenchanagouda died fighting the British here in June 1858. Kinhal 13 km away from Koppal is famous for its traditional colourful lacquerware.

Towns in Koppala District 

 Gangavathi
 Kanakagiri
 Karatagi
 Koppala
 Kuknoor
 Kushtagi
 Munirabad
 Yalaburga
 Bhagyanagar
 Tavaragera
 Kinnal
 Shivapur

Geography

The district occupies an area of 7,190 km² and has a population of 1,196,089, of which 16.58% was urban as of 2001. Koppal district was carved out of Raichur district in 1997.

Taluks 

Koppal district has the following seven talukas: Koppal, Gangavathi, Yelburga, Kushtagi, Kanakagiri, Kukanur and Karatagi.

Demographics

According to the 2011 census Koppal district has a population of 1,389,920, roughly equal to the nation of Eswatini or the US state of Hawaii. This gives it a ranking of 350th in India (out of a total of 640). 
Its population growth rate over the decade 2001-2011 was 16.32%. Koppal has a sex ratio of 983 females for every 1000 males, and a literacy rate of 67.28%. Scheduled Castes and Scheduled Tribes make up 18.61% and 11.82% of the population respectively.

Hindus make up 87.63% of the population while Muslims are 11.64%.

The main language is Kannada, spoken by 84.09% of the population. The second most-populous language is Urdu, spoken by 7.34%, mainly in urban areas. Telugu speakers are 4.17% while Lambadi and Hindi are spoken by 1.64% and 1.44% of the population respectively.

Tourist attractions

Most notable of the many buildings dating from this period is the Mahadeva Temple at Itagi in the Yelabarga taluk.

The Mahadeva Temple

The Mahadeva temple at Itagi dedicated to Shiva is among the larger temples built by the Western Chalukyas and perhaps the most famous.  Inscriptions hail it as the 'Emperor among temples'.  Here, the main temple, the sanctum of which has a linga, is surrounded by thirteen minor shrines, each with its own linga. The temple has two other shrines, dedicated to Murthinarayana and Chandraleshwari, parents of Mahadeva, the Chalukya commander who consecrated the temple in 1112 CE.
Soapstone is found in abundance in the regions of Haveri, Savanur, Byadgi, Motebennur and Hangal. The great archaic sandstone building blocks used by the Badami Chalukyas were superseded with smaller blocks of soapstone and with smaller masonry. 
The first temple to be built from this material was the Amrtesvara Temple in Annigeri in the Dharwad district in 1050 CE. This building was to be the prototype for later, more articulated structures such as the Mahadeva Temple at Itagi.
The 11th-century temple-building boom continued in the 12th century with the addition of new features. The Mahadeva Temple at Itagi and the Siddhesvara Temple in Haveri are standard constructions incorporating these developments. Based on the general plan of the Amrtesvara Temple at Annigeri, the Mahadeva Temple was built in 1112 CE and has the same architectural components as its predecessor. There are however differences in their articulation; the sala roof (roof under the finial of the superstructure) and the miniature towers on pilasters are chiseled instead of moulded.

The difference between the two temples, built fifty years apart, is the more rigid modelling and decoration found in many components of the Mahadeva Temple. The voluptuous carvings of the 11th century were replaced with a more severe chiselling.

In Karnataka their most famous temples are the Kashivishvanatha  temple and the Jain Narayana temple at Pattadakal, both of which are UNESCO World Heritage sites. Other well known temples are the  Parameshwara temple at Konnur, Brahmadeva temple at Savadi, the Settavva, Kontigudi II, Jadaragudi and Ambigeragudi temples at Aihole, Mallikarjuna temple at Ron, Andhakeshwara temple at Huli, Someshwara temple at Sogal, Jain temples at Lokapura, Navalinga Temple at Kuknur, Kumaraswamy temple at Sandur,  at Shirival in Gulbarga and the  Trikunteshwara temple at Gadag which was later expanded by Kalyani Chalukyas. Archeological study of these temples show some have the stellar (multigonal) plan later to be used profusely by the Hoysalas of Belur and Halebidu. One of the richest traditions in Indian architecture took shape in the Deccan during this time and one writer calls it  Karnata dravida style as opposed to traditional Dravida style.

See also
Koppal (Lok Sabha Constituency)
Kushtagi (Lok Sabha constituency)

References

External links

Official website of Koppal district
Kalyani Chalukyan temples on www.templenet.com
Karnataka District Gazetteer Page 36

 
Districts of Karnataka